Ngô Xuân Lịch (born 20 April 1954 in Hà Nam) is a Vietnamese politician and Vietnam's Minister of National Defence and Chief of the General Department of Politics of Vietnam. Ngô Xuân Lịch became a member of the Communist Party of Vietnam on 8 August 1974.

Ngô Xuân Lịch was previously Vice Chief of the General Department of Politics (January 2008 – 2011), and was promoted to the rank of four-star General in 2016. He replaced Lê Văn Dũng as Director of the General Department of Politics in March 2011.

Rank
Ngo Xuan Lich was promoted to Major General in 2003, then to Lieutenant General in 2008 and after that, Colonel General in 2011.

On October 5, 2015, he was promoted to General by the President along with Do Ba Ty who is now Vice-Chairman of National Assembly of Vietnam.

On January 28, 2016, he was elected to the Politburo of Communist Party of Vietnam at its 12th National Congress.

On April 9, 2016, he was appointed as the successor to Phung Quang Thanh and became the new Minister of National Defense of Vietnam.

References

Vietnamese generals
1954 births
Living people
Members of the 12th Politburo of the Communist Party of Vietnam
Members of the 11th Secretariat of the Communist Party of Vietnam
Members of the 10th Central Committee of the Communist Party of Vietnam
Members of the 11th Central Committee of the Communist Party of Vietnam
Members of the 12th Central Committee of the Communist Party of Vietnam
People from Hà Nam Province
Ministers of Defence of Vietnam